Boulemane is a town in northern of Middle Atlas Mountains in Morocco.

Populated places in Boulemane Province
Municipalities of Morocco